The Ascent of Wonder: The Evolution of Hard SF is a definitive 1994 anthology of hard science fiction (sf) short stories compiled by the award-winning editing team of David G. Hartwell and Kathryn Cramer. This 990-page book includes 68 stories, each prefaced by a brief note to describe facts about the author, related works, or the logic of the story's inclusion in the genre. In addition, the book opens with three essays about the meaning and the boundaries of hard science fiction. The editors further explored these issues in The Hard SF Renaissance (2002).

Contents

"Real Science, Imaginary Worlds" by Gregory Benford. This essay discusses diverse connections between hard science fiction and science fact, and with scientists, extremes of scale, postmodernism, fantasy, as well as others. Citing numerous hard SF works, he illuminates the type of far-ranging notions that can be explored while still operating within a reasonably believable framework. Benford points out that similar to the endeavor of science, hard SF authors tend to share ideas and build immense discussions over time with newer works developing concepts further upon those that came before.
 "On Science and Science Fiction" by Kathryn Cramer
 "Hard Science Fiction" by David G. Hartwell

Reception

Alex Anderson wrote in a positive review that Hartwell and Cramer have avoided the problems "behind the failure of the various other [previous] collections ... that have attempted to quantify the genre. These publications all failed for the same reason: omission. ... But not here. Here you'll find Gibson, Asimov, Clarke, Heinlein, Wells, Bear, Dick, Clement, Simak, Poe, Niven, Ballard and, yes, Blish. All the greats, and more. Sixty-nine names that are worth reading, and worth knowing."

Brian Attebery praised the volume as "a substantial (huge, actually) collection of classic and contemporary sf" and analyzes the introductions as well as the stories. Of the essays, he writes, "Yet at the same time the editors are valorizing hard sf, they are also planting doubts." On the one hand, hard science fiction produces pleasure and wonder and, as Cramer writes, it is "the core and center of the sf field," and Hartwell claims that it is "'about the emotional experience of describing and confronting what is scientifically true,' or more concisely, 'the Eureka.'" On the other, "It is this focus on what the editors frequently refer to as the 'hard sf affect' that allows them to pay lip service to conventional formulations of the hard/soft division while dramatically reconstructing our sense of the subgenre." Attebery finds, reading the stories, both "'soft' qualities as characterization, irony, and eloquence" and that a "'harder' underlying design emerges, something about the way technology reinvents human nature." Attebery identifies stories with "the pioneer mythos" and "an impatience with social systems [which] runs through virtually all of the stories in the book." Overall, Attebery writes,

Brian Stableford would find disagreement with the review by Anderson, for he finds significant omissions and he quarrels with some inclusions. After comparing the volume with Groff Conklin's The Best of Science Fiction (1946) and Attebery's and Ursula K. Le Guin's The Norton Book of Science Fiction (1993) ("there is a definite continuity of enterprise"), Stableford wonders why Hawthorne would be presented as a proto-hard-sf writer,

Gary K. Wolfe did praise the anthology as "very readable" and thinks that as "both a reading and a teaching anthology," this book is preferable to the Norton anthology. "Those who believe that hard sf can be defined historically by the period of John W. Campbell, Jr.'s editorship of Astounding will find that Ascent of Wonder contains a pretty good selection of classically Campbell-era stories and authors ... of the sort you would expect in an anthology of this scope."

Like Attebery and Stableford, Wolfe thought the subtitle misleading ("With all the special exceptions and counter-examples, the book's argument is less a theory of sf 'evolution' than a kind of literary creationism") and likely to leave readers new to science fiction feeling unsure what, precisely, hard science fiction is. He wrote that the volume might "confuse the issue more than it clarifies it. ... Most sf readers are likely to come away, as I did, convinced more than ever that hard sf is a fuzzy set—but that it's not this fuzzy." Wolfe finds the story introductions to "sometimes seem directed toward the general reader, sometimes toward the aficionado, and sometimes toward no one at all," which "is almost certain to leave the non-fan feeling like an outsider." He objects to some inclusions (Flynn's is "a ghost story, for heaven's sake!" and Sturgeon's is "arguably not even an sf story") as well as to some themes and modes (Sladek's parody, Tiptree's fantasy). He concludes,

David N. Samuelson shared reservations, too, judging that "this collection of stories is disorderly and diffuse, trying to serve not only the announced purpose, but others as well, among them a history lesson, a pleading for literary quality which may imply terms antithetical to sf "hardness," and a questioning of the very bases outlined in the introductions that supposedly constitute the subject at hand. Superficially laissez-faire, allowing room for each claimant to hard sf status, its scatter-shot methods of selection and presentation in fact deprecate the real thing, watering it down so much as to virtually destroy any generic consistency." He observed, "Scientists as major characters are not common," that scientists "as victims appear more often," and that the "hard sf 'affect' may be evinced by an authoritative quasi-documentary tone and a hefty dose of didacticism (often turned against science in these stories). Sometimes, however, the 'hard man against the universe' pose is confused with the hardheaded intellectual honesty and accuracy science demands." Like Wolfe, he thought the story introductions problematic: "some suffer from vapidity, others dip into specialized literary jargon." Samuelson concludes,

Thomas Easton of Analog Science Fiction and Fact gave a rave review: "If I had received this book for Christmas when I was fifteen, I would have vanished from all human ken for a month, unless I surfaced periodically to scream my delight at the world. I am confident that it would have a similar effect on modern youngsters, so rush out and buy six copies ... And insist that your town and school libraries buy copies, for without this book they can no longer claim an adequate ability to introduce young or old readers to SF. This one is essential."

See also
Hard science
Hard science fiction
Soft science fiction
Hard fantasy

References

External links
The Ascent of Wonder by David G. Hartwell & Kathryn Cramer. Story notes and introductions.

1994 anthologies
Hard science fiction
Science fiction anthologies
Tor Books books